The 2018 EHF European Wheelchair Handball Nations’ Tournament was the 3rd edition and was hosted for the first time in Portugal from 1 to 2 December 2018.

Venues

Match officials

Source:

Preliminary round
''All times are local (UTC+0)

Knockout stage

Third place game

Final

Ranking and statistics

Final ranking

Awards

Top goalscorers

References

External links
Official website 
Second website 

2018
International handball competitions hosted by Portugal
Sport in Leiria
European Wheelchair Handball Nations’ Tournament
Handball
European Wheelchair Handball Nations’ Tournament
European Wheelchair Handball Nations’ Tournament